Haemanota croceicauda is a moth of the family Erebidae first described by Hervé de Toulgoët in 1987. It is found in French Guiana and Bolivia.

References

Haemanota
Moths described in 1987